Morris "Moe" Scharff  was an American physicist and explosive engineer who researched the ablation aspects of the American Project Orion nuclear propulsion spacecraft in the 1950s and 1960s.

Moe died on November 22, 2017.

References

External links
http://www.projectrho.com/public_html/rocket/spacegunconvent.php
 http://www.legacy.com/obituaries/ranchosantafereview/obituary.aspx?n=morris-fraenkel-scharff&pid=187592686

2017 deaths
1929 births